Ricardo Jorge Silva Araújo (born 27 June 1998), also known as Jorginho, is a Portuguese professional footballer who plays as a defender for Sporting da Covilhã.

Honours
Benfica
 UEFA Youth League runner-up: 2016–17

External links

1998 births
People from Vila Nova de Famalicão
Sportspeople from Braga District
Living people
Portuguese footballers
Portugal youth international footballers
Association football defenders
F.C. Famalicão players
S.L. Benfica B players
S.C. Covilhã players
Liga Portugal 2 players